The following lists events that happened during 1836 in Australia.

Incumbents

Governors
Governors of the Australian colonies:
Governor of New South Wales – Major-General Sir Richard Bourke
Governor of South Australia – Captain John Hindmarsh
Lieutenant-Governor of Tasmania – Colonel George Arthur
Governor of Western Australia as a Crown Colony – Captain James Stirling

Events
 14 March – HMS Beagle, carrying Charles Darwin, leaves Australia.

Exploration and settlement
 27 July – Reeves Point (later Kingscote), South Australia's first official European settlement is founded on Kangaroo Island.
 28 December – South Australia and Adelaide are founded.

Births
Thomas a Beckett
Joseph Bancroft
Robert Hamilton
Henry Harrison
Philip Sydney Jones
David Scott Mitchell
William Piguenit
Henry Chamberlain Russell
Samuel Way

Deaths
William Dawes

 
Australia
Years of the 19th century in Australia